Daniel Gabriel Pancu (born 17 August 1977) is a Romanian football coach and a former player who played mainly as an attacking midfielder or a forward. He is the manager of the Romania national under-20 team

Club career
Pancu began his playing career at FC Politehnica Iași. He made his debut in the Romanian First Division in 1995. In the winter of 1996 he was transferred to Rapid București for the sum of US$200,000. He was, at that time, the most expensive player who has left from Iași. After two and a half seasons, he moved to A.C. Cesena, in the Italian Serie B, for a transfer fee of US$1,200,000. After a year, Cesena was relegated from the Serie B and Pancu returned to Rapid for a transfer fee of US$800,000, where he stayed for two seasons. During this tenure he gained the nickname "Ronaldo of Giulești".

In 2002, he was bought by Beşiktaş, at the request of the manager that discovered him, Mircea Lucescu, for a fee of US$2,250,000. It was at Beşiktaş where Lucescu turned him from striker into central midfielder with amazing results. In the winter of 2005/2006 he returned to Rapid, as a loan with the possibility of becoming a permanent transfer in the summer. Then he was bought by Bursaspor, but he returned to Rapid in the spring of 2008 and score one goal in first match for Rapid in 2008. In July 2008 he moved to FC Terek Grozny and left the club on 30 November 2009.

On 11 December 2009, it was announced in the Bulgarian media that CSKA Sofia are having an interest of signing the midfielder to the club. On 12 January 2010, CSKA signed Pancu to a one-a-half-year deal. Pancu made his official debut for CSKA Sofia in the 3–2 win against Lokomotiv Plovdiv in Sofia, scoring his first goal for the club.

After a short spell in Bulgaria at CSKA Sofia, Pancu returned to Romanian football later in 2010 to play for FC Vaslui, but had a difficult time breaking into the first eleven with strong competition from Wesley and Mike Temwanjera. During the summer mercato of 2011 he re-signed for his heart club, Rapid București.

Curiosity
On matchday 28 of the 2004/05 season, at the derby against Fenerbahçe Istanbul, when the score was 2–3, Pancu replaced Óscar Córdoba, after the goalkeeper received a red card and the substitution contingent of Beşiktaş was already exhausted. After penalty goal of Fenerbahce, Pancu resisted the goal efforts of the Fenerbahçe-players and Beşiktaş-player Koray scored the fourth goal for Beşiktaş in the fifth minute of the added time. Beşiktaş won the away game at the Kadiköy Stadium of Fenerbahçe and it was sensational. Pancu was given the nickname "Kadıköy Panteri" (panther of Kadiköy) and dressed in the following season as a regular goalkeeper's jersey with number "1".

Managerial career

On 2 October 2018, Daniel Pancu was appointed as Rapid’s new manager. He obtained the promotion from Liga 3 to Liga 2 after losing only 1 game. In 2020, he was named President of Rapid București.

International career
He gained his first cap for the Romania national team in 1995, he even became captain for a few matches. He played a total of 27 games and scored 9 goals.

International stats

Honours

Club

Player
Rapid București
Divizia A: 1998–99
Cupa României: 1997–98, 2001–02, 2005–06
Supercupa României: 1999, 2002

Beşiktaş
Süper Lig: 2002–03
Turkish Cup: 2005–06

Coach
Rapid București
Liga III: 2018–19

References

External links

1977 births
Living people
Romanian footballers
Romanian expatriate footballers
Romania international footballers
FC Politehnica Iași (1945) players
FC Rapid București players
A.C. Cesena players
Beşiktaş J.K. footballers
Bursaspor footballers
FC Akhmat Grozny players
PFC CSKA Sofia players
FC Vaslui players
FC Voluntari players
Liga I players
Serie B players
Süper Lig players
Russian Premier League players
First Professional Football League (Bulgaria) players
Expatriate footballers in Italy
Expatriate footballers in Turkey
Expatriate footballers in Russia
Expatriate footballers in Bulgaria
Romanian expatriate sportspeople in Bulgaria
Association football midfielders
Association football forwards
Romanian football managers
FC Rapid București managers
FC Politehnica Iași (2010) managers
FC Rapid București presidents
Outfield association footballers who played in goal
Sportspeople from Iași